Oscar Alberto Américo Basso (April 24, 1922May 25, 2007) was an Argentine professional footballer.

Overall, he played 209 games and scored 12 goals for San Lorenzo de Almagro.

Personal life
Basso is the grandfather of footballer Agustín García Basso.

Honours
 Primera División Argentina champion: 1946.

References

1922 births
2007 deaths
Association football defenders
Argentine footballers
Argentine people of Italian descent
Club Atlético Tigre footballers
Club Atlético River Plate footballers
San Lorenzo de Almagro footballers
Argentine expatriate footballers
Expatriate footballers in Italy
Serie A players
Inter Milan players
Expatriate footballers in Brazil
Botafogo de Futebol e Regatas players
CR Vasco da Gama players
Argentine expatriate sportspeople in Brazil
Argentine expatriate sportspeople in Italy
Footballers from Buenos Aires